Malvern Rugby Football Club is a Rugby Union club based in the town of Malvern, Worcestershire, England. They currently play in Midlands 2 West (South) - a tier 7 league in the English rugby union system - after being relegated from Midlands 1 West at the end of the 2018–19 season.  The club has 3 very active senior sides; 1st XV, Development XV, and 3rd XV. It also boasts a thriving academy, the Ian Budd Academy, named after the late Ian Budd, the founder of the academy at Malvern RFC. The club also has junior and mini sides from Under 7s all the way up to U16s, before these players graduate into the Academy, and often into the senior sides from there.

The facilities at Malvern RFC also support rugby in the community, with The King's School, Worcester, 1st XV training there often, under the floodlights, as well as the University of Worcester using the 1st XV pitch for its BUCS fixtures on Wednesdays.

Malvern were relegated from the National leagues at the end of the 2012-13 season and returned to Midlands West One.
They appointed former Worcester Warriors forward Nick Tisdale as director of rugby in 2013. Tisdale is also director of rugby at Malvern College.

Notable former players 
Tommy Hayes
Tim Streather
George Crook
Laurie Essenhigh
Tom "The Cube" Hale
Joe Wilks
Ted Hill
Will Apps

Club Honours 
Pilkington Shield winners: 1993–94
North Midlands 1 champions: 1994–95
Midlands West 1 champions: 1998–99 
Midlands 2 West champions (3): 1999–00, 2000–01, 2007–08
North Midlands Cup winners: 2001–02
Midlands 2 West (north v south) promotion play-off winners: 2017–18
North Midlands Shield winners: 2017–18

League History 
1993-1994 Promotion to North Midlands 1
1994-1995 League Promotion to Midlands West 2
1995-1996 League Promotion to Midlands West 1
1996-1997 Runners-up in Midlands West 1
1997-1998 Midlands West 1
1998-1999 League Promotion to Midlands 2
1999-2000 Winners Midlands 2 but no promotion due to RFU league re-organisation
2000-2001 League winners - Promotion to Midlands 1
2001-2002 Midlands 1; 
2002-2003 League relegation back to Midlands 2 (West)
2003-2004 Midlands 2 (West) 
2004-2005 Runners-up Midlands 2 (West)
2005-2006 Midlands 2 (West)
2006-2007 Midlands 2 (West); 
2007-2008 League Promotion to Midlands 1
2008-2009 Midlands 1
2009-2010 National 3 Midlands ( North Midlands Reserve League Worcs/Hfds Merit Table)

Notes

References

External links 
 Official Malvern RFC website

English rugby union teams
Rugby clubs established in 1934
Sport in Worcester, England
Rugby union in Worcestershire